Artists Rocks is a cliff in Greene County, New York. It is located in the Catskill Mountains southwest of Lawrenceville. North Mountain is located northwest of Artists Rocks.

References

Mountains of Greene County, New York
Mountains of New York (state)